Framework was a planned mixed-use building in Portland, Oregon, United States, that would have been located in the Pearl District neighborhood. Designed by Lever Architecture, it would have been the tallest timber building in North America, and was called the "nation's first high-rise building made of wood". This project was cancelled in 2018 due to a funding shortfall.

Description
The Framework building was designed by architect Thomas Robinson. The timber material planned for the building was cross laminated timber (CLT) utilizing Pres-Lam rocking walls for lateral resistance. The architecture firm had planned to use CLT from D.R. Johnson Lumber Company from Riddle, Oregon. The building's number of stories had been given both as 12 and as 11. Construction was expected to begin in fall 2017.

The mixed-use building would have provided office space on floors two through six, and affordable housing may have been placed on floors seven through eleven.

History
The project team won a $1.5 million grant from the USDA in September 2015 for participating in the Tall Wood Building Prize Competition. 

The design phase included extensive fire, structural and acoustic testing. Building assemblies tested during this phase met the requirements of the Oregon Building Codes Division. Framework was approved by the Portland Design Commission in September 2016, and the construction permit for the project was approved by the state's Building Codes Division on June 6, 2017.

See also
 Carbon12, another wooden building in Portland, Oregon (as of 2017, the tallest in the United States)

References

External links
LEVER Architecture – Framework

Buildings and structures in Portland, Oregon
Pearl District, Portland, Oregon
Proposed buildings and structures in Oregon
Wooden buildings and structures in the United States